This is a list of moths of the family Nepticulidae that are found in South Africa. It also acts as an index to the species articles and forms part of the full List of moths of South Africa.

Acalyptris acumenta (Scoble, 1980)
Acalyptris bispinata (Scoble, 1980)
Acalyptris combretella (Vári, 1955)
Acalyptris fagarivora (Vári, 1955)
Acalyptris fulva (Scoble, 1980)
Acalyptris fuscofascia (Scoble, 1980)
Acalyptris krooni (Scoble, 1980)
Acalyptris lanneivora (Vári, 1955)
Acalyptris lorantivora (Janse, 1948)
Acalyptris lundiensis (Scoble, 1980)
Acalyptris mariepsensis (Scoble, 1980)
Acalyptris molleivora (Scoble, 1980)
Acalyptris obliquella (Scoble, 1980)
Acalyptris pundaensis (Scoble, 1980)
Acalyptris rubiaevora (Scoble, 1980)
Acalyptris sellata (Scoble, 1980)
Acalyptris umdoniensis (Scoble, 1980)
Acalyptris vacuolata (Scoble, 1980)
Acalyptris vepricola (Vári, 1963)
Acalyptris vumbaensis (Scoble, 1980)
Acalyptris zepheriae (Scoble, 1980)
Areticulata leucosideae Scoble, 1983
Ectoedemia alexandria Scoble, 1983
Ectoedemia bicarina Scoble, 1983
Ectoedemia capensis Scoble, 1983
Ectoedemia commiphorella Scoble, 1978
Ectoedemia craspedota (Vári, 1963)
Ectoedemia crispae Scoble, 1983
Ectoedemia denticulata Scoble, 1983
Ectoedemia digitata Scoble, 1983
Ectoedemia furcella Scoble, 1983
Ectoedemia fuscata (Janse, 1948)
Ectoedemia grandinosa (Meyrick, 1911)
Ectoedemia guerkiae Scoble, 1983
Ectoedemia gymnosporiae (Vári, 1955)
Ectoedemia hobohmi (Janse, 1948)
Ectoedemia incisaevora Scoble, 1983
Ectoedemia indicaevora Scoble, 1983
Ectoedemia insulata (Meyrick, 1911)
Ectoedemia jupiteri Scoble, 1983
Ectoedemia knysnaensis Scoble, 1983
Ectoedemia kowynensis Scoble, 1983
Ectoedemia leptodictyae Scoble, 1983
Ectoedemia limburgensis Scoble, 1983
Ectoedemia lucidae Scoble, 1983
Ectoedemia macrochaeta (Meyrick, 1921)
Ectoedemia malelanensis Scoble, 1983
Ectoedemia maritima Scoble, 1983
Ectoedemia mauni Scoble, 1979
Ectoedemia myrtinaecola Scoble, 1983
Ectoedemia nigrimacula (Janse, 1948)
Ectoedemia nigrisquama Scoble, 1983
Ectoedemia nylstroomensis Scoble, 1983
Ectoedemia oleivora (Vári, 1955)
Ectoedemia pappeivora (Vári, 1963)
Ectoedemia portensis Scoble, 1983
Ectoedemia primaria (Meyrick, 1913)
Ectoedemia psarodes (Vári, 1963)
Ectoedemia rhabdophora Scoble, 1983
Ectoedemia royenicola (Vári, 1955)
Ectoedemia scabridae Scoble, 1983
Ectoedemia simiicola Scoble, 1983
Ectoedemia stimulata (Meyrick, 1913)
Ectoedemia subnitescens (Meyrick, 1937)
Ectoedemia tecomariae (Vári, 1955)
Ectoedemia thermae Scoble, 1983
Ectoedemia umdoniella Scoble, 1983
Ectoedemia undatae Scoble, 1983
Ectoedemia vannifera (Meyrick, 1914)
Ectoedemia wilkinsoni Scoble, 1983
Etainia crypsixantha (Meyrick, 1918)
Etainia krugerensis (Scoble, 1983)
Etainia nigricapitella (Janse, 1948)
Etainia zimbabwiensis (Scoble, 1983)
Simplimorpha lanceifoliella (Vári, 1955)
Stigmella abachausi (Janse, 1948)
Stigmella abutilonica Scoble, 1978
Stigmella allophylica Scoble, 1978
Stigmella ampullata Scoble, 1978
Stigmella androflava Scoble, 1978
Stigmella angustivalva Scoble, 1978
Stigmella caliginosa (Meyrick, 1921)
Stigmella celtifoliella Vári, 1955
Stigmella charistis Vári, 1963
Stigmella confinalis Scoble, 1978
Stigmella crotonica Scoble, 1978
Stigmella dombeyivora Scoble, 1978
Stigmella fluida (Meyrick, 1911)
Stigmella galactacma (Meyrick, 1924)
Stigmella generalis Scoble, 1978
Stigmella geranica Scoble, 1978
Stigmella grewiae Scoble, 1978
Stigmella hortorum Scoble, 1978
Stigmella ingens (Meyrick, 1913)
Stigmella irrorata (Janse, 1948)
Stigmella krugeri Vári, 1963
Stigmella letabensis Scoble, 1978
Stigmella liota Vári, 1963
Stigmella nigrata (Meyrick, 1913)
Stigmella panconista (Meyrick, 1920)
Stigmella parinarella Vári, 1955
Stigmella perplexa (Janse, 1948)
Stigmella platyzona Vári, 1963
Stigmella porphyreuta (Meyrick, 1917)
Stigmella potgieteri Scoble, 1978
Stigmella pretoriata Scoble, 1978
Stigmella protosema (Meyrick, 1921)
Stigmella rhynchosiella Vári, 1955
Stigmella satarensis Scoble, 1978
Stigmella tragilis Scoble, 1978
Stigmella triumfettica Scoble, 1978
Stigmella urbica (Meyrick, 1913)
Stigmella varii Scoble, 1978
Stigmella worcesteri Scoble, 1983
Stigmella xuthomitra (Meyrick, 1921)
Trifurcula barbertonensis Scoble, 1980
Trifurcula pulla Scoble, 1980
Varius ochnicolus (Vári, 1955)

Nepticulidae

Moths of Africa